Left and Leaving is the second studio album by The Weakerthans, released July 25, 2000, on G7 Welcoming Committee Records.

In Chart magazine's 2005 poll of the Top 50 Canadian albums of all time, Left and Leaving ranked in sixth place. It was also nominated for Alternative Album of the Year at the 2001 Juno Awards.

"Aside" appears on the soundtrack of the film Wedding Crashers. A punked-up alternate version of "My Favourite Chords", retitled "My Favourite Power Chords", appears on G7 Welcoming Committee's 2005 promotional compilation Take Penacilin Now.

Epitaph Records, the band's current label, rereleased Left and Leaving (along with Fallow) in 2007.

Track listing

References

Further reading 

2000 albums
The Weakerthans albums
G7 Welcoming Committee Records albums